In 1989, there was a total of 180 weekly magazines in the Czech Republic. As of 1995 the magazine sector in the country was small and fragmented. In 2010, the number of magazines was nearly 1800.

There are foreign magazine publishing companies in the country, including Sanoma Magazines Praha, which is a subsidiary of Sanoma.

The following is an incomplete list of current and defunct magazines published in the Czech Republic. It also include those published in Czechoslovakia. They may be published in Czech or in other languages.

A
 A2
 Aspen Review Central Europe

C
 Czech Business Weekly

D
 DTest

F
 Fantastická fakta
 Finance New Europe

K
 Der Kampf

L
 La Gonzo Magazine
 LeveL
 Loutkář
 Lumír
 Lidé a Země

M
 Mladý svět

O
 Orer

P
Prague.TV, Living Like a Local
 The Prague Tribune 
 Přítomnost

R
 Reflex
 Reporter
 Respekt
 Revolver Revue

S
 SPY 
 Světozor

T
 Těšínsko
 Týden

V
 Vedem

X
 X-Ink

Z
 Zwrot
 ZX Magazín

See also
 List of newspapers in the Czech Republic

References

Magazines